Donald Alfred Mountjoy (19 October 1906 – 8 January 1988) was an Australian politician. Born in Middle Swan, Western Australia, he was educated at state schools before becoming a labourer and railwayman, as well as an official with the Australian Railways Union. In 1943, he was elected to the Australian House of Representatives as the Labor member for Swan, defeating sitting member Thomas Marwick. He was defeated by the Country Party's Len Hamilton in 1946, but later that year was appointed executive member of the CSIRO, where he remained until 1949. Mountjoy died in 1988.

References

Australian Labor Party members of the Parliament of Australia
Members of the Australian House of Representatives for Swan
Members of the Australian House of Representatives
1906 births
1988 deaths
Politicians from Perth, Western Australia
20th-century Australian politicians